Agyneta rufidorsa is a species of sheet weaver spider found in France. It was described by Jacques Denis in 1961.

References

rufidorsa
Spiders described in 1961
Spiders of Europe